Silver State is a nickname for Nevada, the American state.

Silver State may also refer to:

Places
 Yinzhou District, Tieling (simplified Chinese: 银州区; traditional Chinese: 銀州區; literally: "Silver State"), a district of Tieling, Liaoning province, China

Brands and enterprises
Silver State Bank, a former commercial bank in Nevada
Silver State Flour Mill, built in 1864 in Nevada
 Silver State Helicopters, a former helicopter flight training, sight seeing tours and charter air operator based in Nevada

Sports
 Silver State Classic Challenge, a motor race on the State Route 318 in Nevada
Silver State Diamond Challenge, a minor league baseball rivalry between the Las Vegas 51s and the Reno Aces, in Nevada
Silver State Legacy, a team of the Women's Football Alliance based in Nevada

Other uses
All Net Resort and Arena, in Nevada, which was to have been the Silver State Arena
Matthew Ryan vs. The Silver State a, 2008 album by Matthew Ryan
Silver State North Solar Project, in Nevada
Silver State South Solar Project, in Nevada
USS Zeilin (APA-3), a ship launched in 1921 as Silver State